Stanton Hall, also known as Belfast, is an Antebellum Classical Revival mansion at 401 High Street in Natchez, Mississippi.  Built in the 1850s, it is one of the most opulent antebellum mansions to survive in the southeastern United States. It is now operated as a historic house museum by the Pilgrimage Garden Club.  The house was declared a National Historic Landmark in 1974 and a Mississippi Landmark in 1995.

Description
Stanton Hall occupies an entire  city block north of downtown Natchez, bounded by High, Commerce, Monroe, and Pearl Streets.  The property is ringed by wrought iron fencing with elaborate gate posts.  The house is a three-story brick structure, plastered and painted white.  Designed and built by Thomas Rose, the house accrued a final bill of about $83,000.  It is also said that Mr. Rose requested to sign his tremendous work somewhere on the property, but Frederick Stanton refused.  In response, Mr. Rose had the wrought iron fencing around the house designed with an abundance of roses as his stamp in quiet defiance. 
Its front entrance features a two-story Greek temple portico, with four fluted Corinthian columns supporting an entablature and gabled pediment.  Spaces between the columns have decorative iron railings, repeated in a second-floor balcony railing set under the portico.  The main roof is hipped, and truncated with a large cupola at the center.  The interior is elaborately decorated, using materials such as imported Italian marble, textiles from Paris and chandeliers made of glass and bronze.

History 

Stanton Hall was built during 1851–57 for Frederick Stanton, a cotton broker, as a replica of his ancestral home in Ireland.  Stanton named it "Belfast", but only lived in it for nine months before he died of yellow fever.  The house's scale and opulence made it a great financial burden on his heirs, but it survived the American Civil War, and in 1890 was made home to the Stanton College for Young Ladies.  In 1940 it was acquired by the Pilgrimage Garden Club, which uses it as its headquarters and operates it as a museum and event venue.

In popular culture 
The mansion serves as a design for Disneyland's Haunted Mansion.

The house's insides have appeared in ABC's mini-series North and South as the Mains' mansion interiors. The house was also seen briefly in Show Boat (1951).

In South and West: From a Notebook, Joan Didion writes that Ben Toledano's wife suggested she visit Stanton Hall as well as the Asphodel Plantation, the Oakley Plantation and the Rosedown Plantation to understand the South better.

Notes

References

External links

 Official Stanton Hall and Longwood website 
 Natchez on the River: Stanton Hall

1857 establishments in Mississippi
Antebellum architecture
Historic house museums in Mississippi
Houses completed in 1857
Houses in Natchez, Mississippi
Individually listed contributing properties to historic districts on the National Register in Mississippi
Mississippi Landmarks
Museums in Natchez, Mississippi
National Historic Landmarks in Mississippi
National Register of Historic Places in Natchez, Mississippi
Neoclassical architecture in Mississippi